Salvatore "Sam" Tarascio (born 22 June 1944) is an Italian-born Australian billionaire businessman. Tarascio owns a portfolio of commercial and industrial real estate across Melbourne, including a business park, two distribution sites, a large shopping mall and a market.  In 1972 Tarascio founded Salta Properties, a privately owned company, after buying swampland and constructing a warehouse for Hoechst. Prior to entering the property market, Tarascio worked in pharmaceutical sales.

Salta Properties is managed by Tarascio's eldest son, also called Sam.

Personal life 
He is married to Christine Tarascio (née Johnson), and they have three children, Sam (b. 1975), Lisa (b. 1977), and David (b. 1979).

In 2018, Tarascio published an autobiography entitled, My Way.

Tarascio has interests in growing olives and extra virgin olive oil production, with a property located on the Mornington Peninsula. In  in Vizzini, Tarascio's grandfather, Salvatore (Turi) Tarascio, commenced the family tradition of olive pressing.

Net worth

Published works

References

External links 
 
 

Living people
1944 births
Italian emigrants to Australia
Businesspeople from Melbourne
Australian billionaires